Clapper Post was an urban postal service in Vienna, the capital of Austria, and in some of the country's other cities, that began in 1772. Its name refers to a clapper (a type of rattle) with which mail carriers announced their arrival. In Vienna, it existed for more than ten years.

References

External links 
 
 
 
 
 
 
  Photos of similar rattles are given that were used by English police in the 19th century

Postal history
18th century in Vienna
1772 establishments in Austria